Al-Amara Sport Club is an Iraqi football team based in Al-Amarah, Maysan, that plays in Iraq Division Two.

History

In Premier League
Al-Amara team played in the Iraqi Premier League for the first time in the 1988–89 season in the South Group, the club's name was Al-Hurriya at that time, and the team was not good enough, and eventually relegated to the Iraq Division One.

In the 1993–94 season, the team returned to play in the Iraqi Premier League, and at that time the name of the club was changed to Al-Amara, the team ended their season in twenty-first place and was able to continue playing in the league, and their results were not good, as it won 10 matches, drawing 16, and lost 24. The following season, the 1994–95 season, the team did not bring anything new, as the team continued its poor results, winning 10 match, drawing 11 and losing all their other matches, and relegated to the Iraq Division One.

Managerial history

  Saad Hamil 
  Hamed Karim

References

External links
 Al-Amara SC on Goalzz.com
 Iraq Clubs- Foundation Dates

1956 establishments in Iraq
Association football clubs established in 1956
Football clubs in Maysan